Galataport is a  mixed-use development located along  of shore in the Karaköy neighbourhood of Istanbul, Turkey on the European shore of the Bosporus strait near its confluence with the Golden Horn right in the heart of the city. It includes the city's cruise ship terminal, around 250 shops and restaurants, a Peninsula hotel, the Istanbul Modern art museum, and other cultural and entertainment facilities; the complex also hosts festivals.

History

Origins
By the late 20th century that site was no longer suitable to accommodate the growing number of ever larger cruise ships wanting to drop anchor in the city so a new site was sought. The location selected had long been home to warehouses associated with the port but most of these had fallen out of use. By the end of the 20th century it was best known as being the location of the Istanbul Modern art gallery (housed in an old warehouse) and a string of nargile (water-pipe) cafes popular with young people. But a line of grand buildings, most stripped of a purpose, stretched north from Karaköy, just waiting to be given new life. Most conspicuous of these was the Paket Postanesi, the old parcel sorting office, but the old Customs Office was also a very striking building.

Development of the Port 
The project to develop Galataport was a joint venture between Turkey's Doğuş Group and Bilgili Holding, who, between them, invested over US$1.8 billion in the venture. The development now occupies  of shoreline, part of it on reclaimed land.

After delays caused in part by the COVID-19 pandemic, the terminal started to open in 2021, with the first ship docking there in October 2021. By 2022 the terminal was entirely open to ships.

Components

Cruise terminal
The cruise terminal covers 29,000 sq metres of land and spreads along 1.2 kilometres of shore, with views across the water to the historic peninsula of Istanbul with Topkapı Palace and the Ayasofya Mosque at its heart. It has space for three large cruise ships to dock side by side behind specially designed screens that rise to ensure that no one can leave the ships without passing through the Customs and Immigration facilities but that are retracted when no ships are in port. Customs and Immigration facilities are located underground, with most of the overground space taken up by shops, restaurants and offices. Many familiar international chains such as Starbucks and Burger King have opened branches here alongside Turkish chain stores such as Kahve Dünyası, D&R and Baylan.

Public square
Development of the port area includes the creation of a new square covering the site of an old military parade ground and centred on Istanbul's first free-standing clocktower. The water side of the square is occupied by the new Renzo Piano-designed home for the Istanbul Modern art gallery, scheduled to open in the autumn of 2022. The north side of the square is filled with the new home for the Istanbul Painting and Sculpture Museum (Turkish: İstanbul Resim ve Heykel Müzesi), a collection of mainly 19th and early 20th-century Turkish works of art moved here from its old home beside the Dolmabahçe Palace and also scheduled to open in the autumn of 2022. The west side of the square is occupied by the striking Nusretiye (Victory) Mosque, dating back to the 1820s, and by the pretty William James Smith-designed Tophane Pavilion (Turkish: Tophane Kasrı), dating back to 1852 and built to provide a base for the sultan while he was viewing his troops in the square. The southern side of the square is partly filled by the Mimar Sinan-designed 16th-century Kılıç Ali Paşa Mosque and by the elaborately decorated, free-standing Tophane Fountain, erected in 1732.

The square is large enough to accommodate a stage for concerts and other organised activities.

Shopping and dining

The shore area connecting the main part of the cruise terminal to the Karaköy ferry terminal and the Galata Bridge has also been redeveloped as part of the Galataport project.

The shopping and dining complex consists of one large group of modern buildings (block  at the northern end of Galataport, as well as the Paket Postanesi ("package post office"), designed by S Saboureaux and opened in 1911 has been restored to house shops and exhibition space. All in all, these areas are 52,000 sqm in area.

There are 250 shops and restaurants and other food service outlets in total, including branches of the Hafiz Mustafa 1864 baklava and dessert café, Beymen luxury department store, and Vakko Group's Vakkorama, a junior department store aimed at younger shoppers, and many other well-known international and Turkish retailers.

Other

Galataport also incorporates:
The Istanbul Modern art museum
 The İstanbul State Art and Sculpture Museum of the Mimar Sinan Fine Arts University
 A Peninsula hotel, built in the old Karaköy Passenger Terminal (Yolcu Salonu) building designed by Rebii Gorbon in 1936 It has a landmark tower on its roof that originally had a clock designed by Mustafa Şem-i, a watchmaker at the court of Sultan Abdülhamid II.
Other nearby buildings, including the lavishly tiled old Customs Building (Turkish: Gümrük Binası) dating back to 1895, are still in the process of being renovated and found new uses. 
43,000 sqm of office space
A parking garage for 2,400 cars

Impact of Galataport 

Galataport is a transformative project for Istanbul. Not only will it greatly increase the number of tourists coming into the city in large groups but the adjoining areas of Karaköy and Tophane are already changing as shops and restaurants shift their focus from catering to locals to catering to tourists. In the years leading up to the opening of the new cruise terminal a large number of new hotels had already opened in these areas alongside many properties rented out through Airbnb. These trends are only likely to accelerate now that the port is open.

References

External links
 (in English)

Shopping malls in Istanbul
Beyoğlu
Buildings and structures in Istanbul
Mixed-use developments
Passenger ship terminals